Keshan Wijerathne (born 28 March 1996) is a Sri Lankan cricketer. He made his first-class debut for Colts Cricket Club in the 2016–17 Premier League Tournament on 21 December 2016.

References

External links
 

1996 births
Living people
Sri Lankan cricketers
Colts Cricket Club cricketers
Sportspeople from Kurunegala